AANP may refer to: 

 American Association of Neuropathologists, a professional association for neuropathologists
 American Association of Nurse Practitioners, a professional association for nurse practitioners